Manuel "Matty" Moroun (June 5, 1927 – July 12, 2020) was an American billionaire businessman, most notable as the owner of the Ambassador Bridge international crossing connecting Detroit, Michigan, and Windsor, Ontario. The bridge, which Moroun purchased from the Bower family in 1979, is one of the few privately-owned border crossings between the United States and Canada.

The bridge is now estimated to be worth between $1.5 and $3 billion. CenTra, Inc. is also the controlling body of Central Transport International, an LTL trucking carrier. Moroun also had a controlling stake in Universal Truckload Services Inc., which is a holding company for several over-the-road truck lines and logistics companies (Universal Am-Can Ltd., Mason Dixon Lines, Economy Transport, Cavalry Logistics, Louisiana Transportation, Inc., etc.). Moroun was formerly owner of the Roosevelt Warehouse and of Michigan Central Station. On June 11, 2018, Matthew Mourun confirmed the transfer of possession and sale of the station and the warehouse to the Ford Motor Company. A 2008 Forbes article listed Matty Maroun as the 321st-richest American.

Early life 
Manuel Moroun was born in Detroit in 1927. He was of Lebanese descent; his grandfather first moved from South America to Windsor, Ontario, before residing in Detroit after the First World War ended. Matty grew up on the city's east side with three sisters. His father ran two gas stations in Detroit, where Matty worked before and during high school, which he completed at the University of Detroit Jesuit High School. He later claimed that Jimmy Hoffa was one of the customers for whom he'd pumped gas.

In 1946, his father bought Central Cartage Company, which would later become Central Transport, and Matty started working with him. During college, Matty regularly commuted between the University of Notre Dame in South Bend, Indiana and Detroit, to help run the family business. He graduated in 1949 with a bachelor's degree in chemistry and biology. He aspired to become a doctor, but ultimately went back to Detroit to work at the family's service station.  He also cleaned and serviced buses for a living. By the middle of the 1950s, Matty was responsible for managing most of his family's trucking business.

Bridge ownership
Moroun bought the Ambassador Bridge in 1979 when shares came on the market. It had originally been privately built by railroad interests.

In 2009, the Michigan Department of Transportation (MDOT) sued Moroun and the Detroit International Bridge Company, for failing to comply with the terms of a contract to construct ramps connecting the Ambassador Bridge to nearby I-75 and I-96 freeways as part of the Gateway Project. In February 2010, Wayne County Circuit Judge Prentis Edwards ruled that Moroun and the chief deputy of the Detroit International Bridge Co., Dan Stamper, were in violation of the contract, and ordered them to come into compliance. On January 12, 2012, Judge Edwards found both Moroun and Stamper to be in non-compliance with his previous order, and ordered both men to jail, denying a motion to stay the order until it could be appealed to the Michigan Court of Appeals. After spending a night in jail, both men were released by the appellate court while they heard the case.

The United States and Canadian governments have agreed to build the Gordie Howe International Bridge, a bridge between Detroit and Windsor to be located downriver, and to be funded entirely by the Canadian government. All tax revenues from tolls from the Gordie Howe bridge are to be granted to Canada for the next 50 years after construction completes. This is in contrast to the tolls collected on the Ambassador Bridge, which are subject to United States taxes and given to Detroit. Critics suggested that Moroun's opposition was fueled by the prospect of lost profits from duty-free gasoline sales at the bridge.

Ed Arditti, of the online news site Windsor Square, suggested the appointment of Mark R. McQueen to the new Windsor-Detroit Bridge Authority was intended to anger the Moroun family. McQueen had been the executive assistant to Hugh Segal, Prime Minister Brian Mulroney's chief of staff, when the Mulroney government had a dispute with Moroun.

Michigan Central Station

Moroun owned Michigan Central Station from 1995 until 2018, when it was then sold to the Ford Motor Company. Moroun and his family had faced criticism for failing to invest in the property over its years of ownership, leading to a significant amount of decay within the property, and generally contributing to the "urban blight" characteristic that has enshrouded Detroit for much of the latter part of the 20th century through the early 21st century.

Personal life
Moroun married his wife, Nora, when he was 44 years old.  Together, they had one child, Matthew, who went on to manage the family business after Moroun retired.  The family resided in Grosse Pointe Shores, Michigan.

One of Moroun's sisters, Agnes, was in charge of the human resources department at CenTra Inc.  His other two sisters, Victoria Baks and Florence McBrien, sued him for $53 million in 1992.  They alleged that he had “cheated them out of their inheritance” following their father's death that same year, in addition to engaging in shareholder oppression, and excluding them from the business.  The seven-year legal battle concluded in October 1999, with a settlement that saw Moroun purchase the shares of his two sisters in CenTra Inc.  He ultimately reconciled with them.

Moroun died of congestive heart failure at his home in Grosse Pointe Shores on July 12, 2020.

References

University of Notre Dame alumni
1927 births
2020 deaths
American billionaires
Businesspeople from Detroit
People from Grosse Pointe, Michigan
American people of Lebanese descent
University of Detroit Jesuit High School and Academy alumni